Short bones are designated as those bones that are as wide as they are long.  Their primary function is to provide support and stability with little to no movement. They are one of five types of bones: short, long, flat, irregular and sesamoid.  Examples of these bones include the tarsals in the foot and the carpals in the hand.

Additional images

References

Stedman's Online Medical Dictionary, 27th Edition

 
Skeletal system